Ragnar Schreiner (2 February 1915 – 16 January 1984) was a Norwegian actor.

He was born in Trondheim. He played at the Carl Johan Theater from 1944 and Rogaland Teater from 1947. Notable roles include Higgins in Pygmalion and Gregers Werle in The Wild Duck.

References

1915 births
1984 deaths
Norwegian male stage actors
Norwegian male film actors
20th-century Norwegian male actors
Actors from Trondheim